HD 174179 is a single star in the northern constellation of Lyra. It has a white hue and is dimly visible to the naked eye with an apparent visual magnitude of 6.06. The star is located at a distance of approximately 1,280 light years from the Sun based on parallax, but is drifting closer with a radial velocity of −15 km/s.

The star is an estimated 33 million years old with a low projected rotational velocity of 5 km/s. It has 6.6 times the mass of the Sun and is radiating 2,036 times the Sun's luminosity from its photosphere at an effective temperature of 17,900 K.

HD 174179 is a Be star, showing Balmer emission lines in its spectrum at times.  It has a stellar classification of B3IVp, with 'p' indicating spectral features of a shell star. A 1976 study found no emission features, but the star was reported to show emission lines again in later studies.

References

B-type subgiants
Shell stars

Lyra (constellation)
Durchmusterung objects
174179
092243
7081